Milnesiidae is a family of tardigrades of the class Eutardigrada It is the sole family in the order Apochela.

Genera 
The family consists of the following genera:

 Bergtrollus Dastych, 2011
 Limmenius Horning, Schuster & Grigarick, 1978
 Milnesioides Claxton, 1999
 Milnesium Doyère, 1840

References

External links 
 

Tardigrade families
Apochela